Owen Pochman (born August 2, 1977) is a former American football placekicker who played in the National Football League (NFL) for the New York Giants (2001–2002) and San Francisco 49ers (2003). He was drafted in the seventh round of the 2001 NFL Draft. Pochman is an alumnus of Brigham Young University.

Post football
Following his NFL career Owen Pochman wrote a book, I'm Just a Kicker, and dated Brande Roderick.  He is a realtor at Mercer Vine and resides in Los Angeles, California.

References

1977 births
Living people
Sportspeople from Renton, Washington
Players of American football from Washington (state)
American football punters
American football placekickers
BYU Cougars football players
New York Giants players
San Francisco 49ers players
Mercer Island High School alumni